A garden square is a type of communal garden in an urban area wholly or substantially surrounded by buildings; commonly, it continues to be applied to public and private parks formed after such a garden becomes accessible to the public at large. The archetypal garden square is surrounded by tall terraced houses and other types of townhouse. Because it is designed for the amenity of surrounding residents, it is subtly distinguished from a town square designed to be a public gathering place: due to its inherent private history, it may have a pattern of dedicated footpaths and tends to have considerably more plants than hard surfaces or large monuments.

Propagation

At their conception in the early 17th century each such garden was a private communal amenity for the residents of the overlooking houses akin to a garden courtyard within a palace or community. Such community courtyards date back to at least Ur in 2000 BC where two-storey houses were built of fired brick around an open square. Kitchen, working, and public spaces were located on the ground floor, with private rooms located upstairs.

In the 20th century, many garden squares that were previously accessible only to defined residents became accessible to the public. Those in central urban locations, such as Leicester Square in London's West End, have become indistinguishable from town squares. Others, while publicly accessible, are largely used by local residents and retain the character of garden squares or small communal parks. Many private squares, even in busy locations, remain private, such as Portman Square in  Marylebone in London, despite its proximity to London's busiest shopping districts.

Occurrence

Europe

United Kingdom

London is famous for them; they are described as one of the glories of the capital. Many were built or rebuilt during the late eighteenth and early nineteenth centuries, at the height of Georgian architecture, and are surrounded by townhouses. Large projects, such as the Bedford Estate, included garden squares in their development. The Notting Hill and Bloomsbury neighbourhoods both have many garden squares, with the former mostly still restricted to residents, and the latter open to all.  Other UK cities prominent in the Georgian era such as Edinburgh, Bath, Bristol and Leeds have several garden squares.

Householders with access to a private garden square are commonly required to pay a maintenance levy. Normally the charge is set annually by a garden committee.

Sometimes private garden squares are opened to the public, such as during Open Garden Squares Weekend.

France

In Paris

Privately owned squares which survived the decades after the French Revolution and 19th century Haussmann's renovation of Paris include the Place des Vosges and Square des Épinettes in Paris. The Place des Vosges was a fashionable and expensive square to live in during the 17th and 18th centuries, and one of the central reasons that Le Marais district became so fashionable for French nobility.  It was inaugurated in 1612 with a grand carrousel to celebrate the engagement of Louis XIII to Anne of Austria and is a prototype of the residential squares of European cities that were to come. What was new about the Place Royale as it was known in 1612 was that the house fronts were all built to the same design, probably by Baptiste du Cerceau.

In town squares, similarly green but publicly accessible from the outset, is the Square René Viviani. Gardens substantially cover a few of the famous Places in the capital; instead the majority are paved and replete with profoundly hard materials such as Place de la Concorde.  Inspired by ecological interests and a 21st-century focus on pollution mitigation, an increasing number of the Places in Paris today many have a focal tree, or surrounding raised flower beds/and or rows of trees such as the Place de la République.

The enclosed garden terraces (French: jardins terrasses) and courtyards (French: cours) of some French former palaces have resulted in redevelopments into spaces equivalent to garden squares.  The same former single-owner scenario applies to at least one garden square in London (Coleridge Square).

Outside of Paris
Grandiose instances of garden-use town squares are a part of many French cities, others opt for solid material town squares.

Belgium
The Square de Meeûs and Square Orban are notable examples in Brussels.

Ireland

Dublin has several Georgian examples, including Merrion Square, Fitzwilliam Square, Mountjoy Square, St Stephens Green and Parnell Square.

The Americas

United States
Perhaps the most famous garden square in the United States is Gramercy Park in southern Midtown Manhattan. Famously, it has remained private and gated throughout its existence; possession of a key to the park is a jealously guarded privilege.

The tradition of fee simple land ownership in American cities has made collective amenities such as garden squares comparatively rare. Very few subdividers and developers included them in plats during the 19th century, with notable exceptions below.

Rittenhouse Square in the Center City, Philadelphia encases a public garden, one of the five original open-space parks planned by William Penn and his surveyor Thomas Holme during the late 17th century. It was first named Southwest Square.

Nearby Fitler Square is a similar garden square named for late 19th century Philadelphia mayor Edwin Henry Fitler shortly after his death in 1896. The Square, cared for through a public private partnership between the Department of Parks and Recreation and the Fitler Square Improvement Association.

In Boston tens of squares exist, some having a mainly residential use.

The Kingstowne development in Fairfax County, Virginia, near Washington, DC, contains several townhouse complexes built around garden squares.

Africa

Asia

Australia and New Zealand

See also 
 Communal garden
 Private park
 Courtyard
 Urban open space
 Architecture of the United Kingdom
 Parks and open spaces in London
 List of garden squares in London
 Squares in London
 Terraced houses in the United Kingdom
 Townhouse (Great Britain)

References 

Town squares
Urban planning
Types of garden
Town and country planning in the United Kingdom